The 2005–06 season was Port Vale's 94th season of football in the English Football League, and second successive season in League One. They finished in mid-table, and exited the League Cup at the First Round and the League Trophy at the Second Round. In the FA Cup, Vale made it to the Fourth Round, where they were knocked out 3–1 by top-flight Aston Villa. Foyle's efforts to build a promotion-winning team were boosted when Vale gained striker Leon Constantine, but his efforts were hindered with the sales of both Sam Collins and Billy Paynter.

Overview

League One
The pre-season saw Martin Foyle sign Micky Bell and Hector Sam on free transfers from Bristol City and Wrexham respectively. He also took in promising young striker Chris Cornes on loan from Wolverhampton Wanderers, who would impress in a Vale shirt.

The season started with fourteen points from seven games to launch the club's promotion bid. After three defeats the Vale then entered a long period of inconsistent form. In September, Darrell Clarke joined on loan from Hartlepool United, though he would play just the one game for the club. Gary Mulligan also arrived on loan from Sheffield United, and would find greater success in Burslem. The next month Foyle added to the squad by signing Michael Husbands from Walsall. In November, Sam Togwell joined on loan from Scunthorpe United, in an initial six week deal that was extended until the end of the season. Another long-term loan deal was struck with Leyton Orient for big defender Clayton Fortune, who would later turn down a permanent transfer to Vale Park after failing to agree on personal terms. Foyle also made possibly the best signing of his spell in charge at Vale, bringing striker Leon Constantine in from Torquay United for a £20,000 fee. However Foyle lost two big players, when key defender Sam Collins and promising striker Billy Paynter were sold to Hull City for £65,000 and £150,000 respectively, the pair leaving on loan deals until the January transfer window (when they would leave permanently). Four straight defeats followed this, emphasising the effect the sales had on the club's promotion bid. In January, Bell moved on to Cheltenham Town, and Hector Sam joined Walsall. In came Jason Talbot on loan from Mansfield Town, who joined the club permanently at the end of the season. Foyle also signed defender Mark McGregor from Blackpool, and midfielder Sean Doherty from ADO Den Haag. A sequence of two points in five games killed off the Vale's promotion hopes by April.

They finished in thirteenth place with sixty points, some distance from both promotion and relegation. Only the four relegated teams scored fewer goals than Vale, and Constantine was the club's top-scorer with twelve goals, closely followed by Cummins with eleven.

At the end of the season nine players departed the club: Lee Matthews (Crewe Alexandra); Hector Sam (Walsall); Steve Rowland (Southport); Tony Dinning (Stockport County); Micky Cummins (Darlington); Jonny Brain (Macclesfield Town); Mark Innes (Hyde United); Sean Doherty (Accrington Stanley); and Craig James (Darlington). Andy Porter retired to concentrate on his coaching. With Dinning's departure, George Pilkington was appointed club captain. World Cup international winger Chris Birchall was also sold to Coventry City for £325,000.

Finances
On the financial side, Bill Bratt's cost-cutting measures had reduced the club's operating losses from £500,000 to £50,000. Despite this, the club took out a £2.25 million loan from the local council, with monthly repayments of around £19,000. Bratt continued to try and woo elderly North American millionaires, but Steve Stavro did not follow up his initial interest with any investment. In October 2005, the club turned down an investment group that wished to appoint Paul Gascoigne as manager. Foyle said "We need a cup run, or an investor, to give us a kick-start because we aren't doing too badly". He got his wish with an expected income of £250,000 from the Villa game. In February, lifelong fan Robbie Williams bought £240,000 of the £250,000 worth of available shares in the club. In April, the club announced a new record-breaking shirt sponsorship deal with BGC Gas. The club also announced Bill Bratt would now be a paid chief executive.

Cup competitions
In the FA Cup, Vale advanced past Wrexham to reach a Second Round encounter with Bristol Rovers. A late equalizer from Constantine earned Vale a replay, and a Chris Birchall strike gave the "Valiants" victory at the Memorial Stadium. They then made it to the Fourth Round after a 2–1 win over Doncaster Rovers thanks to a brace from loanee Sam Togwell. They faced a trip to Villa Park to face Premier League Aston Villa, where they were defeated 3–1 after a brace from Milan Baroš.

In the League Cup, Vale were knocked out 3–1 by Rotherham United at the Don Valley Stadium, with Hector Sam breaking his leg during the game.

In the League Trophy, Vale received a bye in the First Round, but in the Second Round were embarrassed to lose 2–1 to Conference club Hereford United at Edgar Street, after a Tamika Mkandawire header in extra-time.

League table

Results
Port Vale's score comes first

Football League One

Results by matchday

Matches

FA Cup

League Cup

League Trophy

Player statistics

Appearances

Top scorers

Transfers

Transfers in

Transfers out

Loans in

Loans out

References
Specific

General
Soccerbase

Port Vale F.C. seasons
Port Vale